Velutinidae is a family of small sea snails, marine gastropod molluscs in the clade Littorinimorpha.

The shell of these animals is very thin and delicate, and internal, completely covered by the mantle (which has fused lobes) so the appearance of these animals more closely resembles that of sea slugs rather than sea snails.

Taxonomy 

The following two subfamilies were recognized in the taxonomy of Bouchet & Rocroi (2005):

 Subfamily Velutininae J. E. Gray, 1840 - synonyms: Marseniidae Leach in Gray, 1847; Marsenininae Odhner, 1913; Capulacmaeinae Golikov & Gulbin, 1990; Onchidiopsinae Golikov & Gulbin, 1990 (n.a.); Marseniopsidae Badel, 1993 (n.a.)
 Subfamily Lamellariinae A. D. d'Orbigny, 1841 - synonyms: Coriocellidae Troschel, 1848; Sacculidae Thiele, 1929 (inv.); Pseudosacculidae Kuroda, 1933

Genera 
Genera within the family Velutinidae include:
 Calyptoconcha
 Calyptoconcha pellucida A. E. Verrill, 1880 - translucent lamellaria
 Cartilagovelutina Golikov & Gulbin, 1990
 Cartilagovelutina beringensis (Derjugin, 1950)
 Cartilagovelutina chondrina (Bartsch in Derjugin, 1950)
 Cartilagovelutina cristata (Derjugin, 1950)
 Ciliatovelutina Golikov & Gulbin, 1990
 Cilifera Golikov & Gulbin, 1990
 Coriocella Blainville, 1824 
 Echinospira Krohn, 1853
 Lamellaria G. Montagu, 1815
 Lamellariopsis Vayssière, 1906
 Limneria H. Adams & A. Adams, 1851
 Marseniella Bergh, 1886
 Marseniella borealis Bergh, 1886
 Marsenina  Gray, 1850
 Marseniopsis Bergh, 1886
 Mysticoncha Allan, 1936
 Onchidiopsis Bergh, 1853
 Onchidiopsis glacialis M. Sars, 1851 - icy lamellaria
 Onchidiopsis latissima Odhner, 1913
 Onchidiopsis spitzbergensis Jensen, in Thorson, 1944
 Piliscus Lovén, 1859
 Piliscus commodus Middendorff, 1851
 Piliscus rostratus (Golikov & Gulbin, 1990)
 Piliscus undulatus (Golikov & Gulbin, 1990)
 Pseudosacculus Hirase, 1928
 Pseudotorellia Warén, 1989
 Pseudotorellia fragilis Warén, 1989
 Torellivelutina McLean, 2000
 Velutina Fleming, 1820
 Velutina plicatilis (Müller, 1776)
 Velutina schneideri Friele, 1886
 Velutina velutina (Müller, 1776)

Subfamily Lamellariinae A. D. d'Orbigny, 1841

Subfamily Velutininae  Gray, 1840
Genera brought into synonymy
 Capulacmaea M. Sars, 1859 : synonym of Piliscus Lovén, 1859
 Chelinotus Swainson, 1840: synonym of Coriocella Blainville, 1824
 Cryptocella H. Adams & A. Adams, 1853: synonym of Lamellaria Montagu, 1815
 Marsenia Oken, 1823: synonym of Lamellaria Montagu, 1815
 Marvillia [sic]: synonym of Limneria H. Adams & A. Adams, 1851
 Morvillia Gray, 1857: synonym of Limneria H. Adams & A. Adams, 1851
 Oithonella Mörch, 1857: synonym of Marsenina Gray, 1850
 Oncidiopsis [sic]: synonym of Onchidiopsis Bergh, 1853
 Pilidium Middendorff, 1851: synonym of Piliscus Lovén, 1859
 Pseudoacculus [sic]: synonym of Pseudosacculus Hirase, 1928
 Sacculus Hirase, 1927: synonym of Pseudosacculus Hirase, 1928
 Velutella Gray, 1847: synonym of Velutina Fleming, 1820

References

Sources
 Philippe Bouchet, Rocroi J.P., Hausdorf B., Kaim A., Kano Y., Nützel A., Parkhaev P., Schrödl M. & Strong E.E. (2017). Revised classification, nomenclator and typification of gastropod and monoplacophoran families. Malacologia. 61(1-2): 1-526.

External links

 WoRMS official family page
 Sea Slug Forum info

 
Taxa named by John Edward Gray